Vasyeh Kash (also Romanized as Vesyeh Kash, Vesyeh Kesh, and Vasīeh Kash; also known as Vastikah, Vazīr Kash, and Vesī Kesh) is a village in Valupey Rural District, in the Central District of Savadkuh County, Mazandaran Province, Iran. At the 2006 census, its population was 76, in 21 families.

References 

Populated places in Savadkuh County